The Vega Expedition of 1878–1880, named after the  and under the leadership of Swedish Finnish explorer Adolf Erik Nordenskiöld, was the first Arctic expedition to navigate through the Northeast Passage, the sea route between Europe and Asia through the Arctic Ocean, and the first voyage to circumnavigate Eurasia.  Initially a troubled enterprise, the successful expedition is considered to be among the highest achievements in the history of Swedish science.

Preparations
Nordenskiöld had already conducted a series of expeditions in the Arctic, including to Svalbard, West Greenland, the Kara Sea and the Yenisei River.

In 1877, Nordenskiöld began planning the expedition to find the Northeast Passage, and in July he presented a detailed plan to King Oscar II, who accepted the proposal. Additional funds were provided by members of the Swedish Society for Anthropology and Geography and the Royal Society of Sciences and Letters in Gothenburg, and private individuals, notably  Swedish industrialist and philanthropist Oscar Dickson (1823-1897) and Russian industrialist Alexander Sibiryakov (1849–1933).

The steamship Vega, constructed in 1872 at Bremerhaven as a sealer and whaler, was bought for the expedition, and was converted at the Karlskrona naval shipyards in Blekinge, Sweden, with government funding. Sibiryakov also equipped another steamship, Lena, which would accompany the expedition until the Lena River in Siberia.

Expedition members
Louis Palander (1842–1920) was appointed captain of the expedition. Palander was a Swedish naval officer and an experienced sailor who had already made several trips in the Arctic and had previously participated in other Nordenskiöld expeditions. It also included scientists, officers and a crew of 21 men.

Noted members of the international team included:
 Ernst Almquist, Swedish doctor, botanist and lichenologist
 Karl Johan Andersson, Swedish xylographer and painter
 Giacomo Bove, Italian sailing master, in charge of the Marine chronometers, made astronomical observations needed to fix the ship's position
 Andreas Peter Hovgaard, Danish naval officer, explorer and meteorologist, responsible for the meteorological and magnetic observations
 Frans Reinhold Kjellman, Swedish botanist 
 Oscar Frithiof Nordquist, Finnish hydrographer and zoologist, acted as the Russian interpreter
 Anton Stuxberg, Swedish zoologist

The expedition

Vega left Karlskrona on June 22, 1878, made a stop in Tromsø from July 17 until July 21. In Tromsø, Vega was joined by the cargo ship Lena, commanded by Edvard Holm Johanssen. The ships reached Cape Chelyuskin, the northernmost tip of the Eurasian continent, on August 19, 1878. Lena navigated up the Lena river towards Yakutsk on August 27, with Vega continuing east along the coast, which had only a narrow ice-free strip a couple of miles wide.

Vega's progress stopped in pack ice on September 28, 1878, about 1.5 kilometers from the coast at the Chukchi Peninsula at Neshkan, only days from the Bering Strait. The expedition spent the winter there. Vega could be freed from the ice only the next summer, on August 18, 1879, and it reached Bering Strait on August 20.
Vega stopped in Japan for repairs for almost two months, and returned to Sweden through the Indian Ocean and the Suez canal. It returned to Stockholm on April 24, 1880.

See also
 Albatross expedition (1947–48), Swedish oceanographic expedition
 Cape Vega, a headland in the Kara Sea named after the ship.
 History of research ships

References

1870s in Sweden
Arctic expeditions
Expeditions from Sweden
Naval history of Sweden
1880 in Sweden
Science and technology in Sweden
History of Stockholm
1870s in science
1878 in science
1879 in science
1880 in science
19th century in the Arctic
1880s in Stockholm